Rat tail or rat's tail may refer to:
 The tail of a rat
 Rattail, fish of the family Macrouridae
 Rattail (casting), a defect in metal casting
 Rattail (haircut)
 Rattail skate (Dipturus lanceorostratus), a fish endemic to Mozambique
 Rat-tail splice, a type of electrical splice
 Babiana ringens, a flowering plant of South Africa
 Raphanus caudatus or rattail radish

See also 
 Rat tail cactus (disambiguation)
 Rattail orchid (disambiguation)

Animal common name disambiguation pages